This is a list of the major and minor characters featured in and/or created specifically for the Cartoon Network animated series, Teen Titans Go!.

Teen Titans

Robin

 Voiced by: Scott Menville (reprising)
Robin is the leader and the only Titan who does not possess any superpowers. He primarily relies on his arsenal of weapons and tools during combat. His weapons of preference are his Birdarangs, grapple guns and multi-purpose metallic bo staff. He is also incredibly agile, and is a studious scientist, detective and martial artist.

Robin is disciplined and serious. Robin's role as leader is modestly parodied throughout the series. He prefers to take the lead role at all times. Robin is also at times emotionally unstable, arrogant and self-centered. However, despite his flaws he usually learns from his mistakes and tries to make amends.

His original comic book likeness is also featured briefly in "Books", and he is seen in his original comics outfit in a flashback in "Baby Hands". It transpires that Robin also eventually grows up to become Nightwing in "Staring at the Future", a point which is reinforced in "Sandwich Thief".

Starfire

 Voiced by: Hynden Walch (reprising)

An orange-skinned, green-eyed alien princess, Starfire (real name Koriand'r) is formidable for her superhuman strength, faster-than-light flight, and ability to emit bright green energy bolts from either her hands or her eyes. Starfire is a generally happy and naive person and is relentlessly kind and polite to everyone, even to her occasional foes in battle. She expresses interests in self-maintenance to upkeep her appearance in the new series.

Starfire  is slightly modified from her previous likeness, with design changes to her boots, hair, and flight trail.

Her original comic book likeness is also featured briefly in "Books", and she is seen in a less sexualized version of her original comics outfit in a flashback in "Baby Hands". It would also be revealed that Starfire would become the queen of her home world Tamaran in "Staring At The Future".

Raven

 Voiced by: Tara Strong (reprising)

Raven is a mystical half-demon with a range of superpowers based upon her skills with magic. Her appearance slightly changed in the Go! series to have paler skin and shorter hair.

Raven is of a very apathetic and acerbic nature, almost seemingly devoid of emotion, and often interacts with her teammates through means of sarcasm and occasional bouts of demonic anger. Despite some parts of her personality staying similar, others were modified for the Go! series. She is shown to have feelings for her teammate Beast Boy but often hides it from everyone.

Robin categorized Raven's role in the group as "the sarcastic older sister" in "Uncle Jokes". She is seen in her original comics outfit in a flashback in "Baby Hands".

Beast Boy

 Voiced by: Greg Cipes (reprising)

Beast Boy has a purple-and-black Doom Patrol uniform, pointed ears, and green skin. He is shown to have feelings for both Raven and Terra, he often goes to Terra if he tried to get Raven to go out with him on a date and will constantly be rejected everytime.

As in the comics, Beast Boy is very good friends with fellow Titan Cyborg, though their friendship would be tested at times.

His original comic book likeness is also featured briefly in "Books", and he is seen in his original comics outfit in a flashback in "Baby Hands". Beast Boy sings a modified version of Love Won't Fade, a song written and performed by Cipes' musical group to Terra in the Valentine's Day episode "Be Mine".

Cyborg

 Voiced by: Khary Payton (reprising)

Cyborg is a tall, prideful cyborg. Much of his body contains an arsenal of hidden weapons, such as lasers and missiles, but includes various commodities and appliances. He has feelings for Jinx and once dated in "Opposites".

Unlike the original series, Cyborg is now a disembodied head connected by a small system of wires which make up a miniature body, making him more robot than human. However, this is often inconsistent from episode to episode.

His original comic book likeness is featured briefly in "Books,” and he is seen in his original comics outfit in a flashback in "Baby Hands." A chibi of Victor Stone, his human self prior to automation, is displayed briefly in "Caged Tiger.” Cyborg explains his origin story, accompanied by a thought bubble recollection of the event, in "Man Person.”

Allies

Bumblebee

 Voiced by: Ozioma Akagha (replacing T'Keyah Crystal Keymáh from the original series)

Bumblebee is the former leader and only female member of the Titans East from Steel City. She becomes the sixth Teen Titan in the "Super Summer Hero Camp" 5-part miniseries, which is also her first speaking role, only to leave the team eight episodes later in "The Viewers Decide". As her name suggests, she can shrink to the size of a bumblebee, fly, and sting her enemies with shocking stingers.

Aqualad

 Voiced by: Wil Wheaton (reprising)

Traditionally Aquaman's sidekick, Aqualad is an Atlantean hydrokinetic empath with the ability to telepathically communicate with sea creatures. Aqualad appears as a  humanoid male with black hair and white-irised black eyes. He wears a two-tone blue bodysuit, along with black boots with shark decals on the soles.

Más y Menos

 Voiced by: Freddy Rodriguez (reprising dual role)

Debuting in the previous animated series as Titans East members, Más y Menos (which translates into "Plus and Minus") are energetic, Spanish-speaking Guatemalan twin brothers.

Speedy

 Voiced by: Scott Menville (replacing Mike Erwin from the original series)

Speedy is a red-headed superhero wearing a red-and-yellow uniform and a black Harlequin eye mask much like Robin's. He is a master of archery, and was formerly Green Arrow's sidekick. Made an Honorary Titan in the previous animated series, Speedy is the first such hero to be seen and given a speaking role in the spin-off.

The Wonder Twins

 Voiced by: Tara Strong (Jayna), Khary Payton (Zan)

First introduced as supporting characters in the Super Friends cartoon series, The Wonder Twins are an alien brother-sister duo affiliated with the Justice League of America. Jayna, the sister, has the ability to morph into any animal and gain their respective skills, instincts and near-superhuman abilities. Zan, the brother, can morph into any form of water, whether solid, liquid, or gaseous.

Villains

The H.I.V.E. Five

The H.I.V.E. Five are a group of teen supervillains from a criminal organization known as the H.I.V.E. Academy. Thus far, they are the most recurring villain characters of Teen Titans Go!, appearing in a majority of the series' episodes as the central enemies. Brother Blood is noted as being the H.I.V.E.'s leader in one episode, and the five villains that make up the group are often simply called "The H.I.V.E." as opposed to the "H.I.V.E. Five."

Gizmo

 Voiced by: Lauren Tom (reprising)

Gizmo is a diminutive boy genius with a skill in invention and engineering; like the previous series, he is again partnered regularly with the H.I.V.E. Five, acting as its leader.

Jinx

 Voiced by: Lauren Tom (reprising)

Jinx is a pink-haired, gray-skinned, doll-like teen girl who wields magic powers of her namesake which create bad luck for its targets. Though she gradually became more of a heroic character by the conclusion of Teen Titans and its tie-in comic book series, Jinx has been reverted to a villainous character for the new show.

Mammoth

 Voiced by: Kevin Michael Richardson (reprising)

Mammoth is a feral and bestial leviathan with superhuman strength, though he appears less like a mammoth and more like a smilodon. He is regularly featured as a member of the H.I.V.E. Five, as he was before in Teen Titans.

Billy Numerous

 Voiced by: Scott Menville (replacing Jason Marsden from the original series)

Billy Numerous is a member of the H.I.V.E. Five with the ability to generate clones of himself. He wears a red bodysuit with a division symbol on its chest as well as on the soles of its boots.

Like the other members of the H.I.V.E. Five, Billy first appears in "Super Robin," loading a truck with the money bags from a bank they are robbing. The Teen Titans arrives to stop them; he attempts to outnumber and overpower Starfire, but he and his clones are quickly incinerated by her star bolts. Numerous is also seen with the H.I.V.E. Five when they return in "Artful Dodgers;" though they end up captured by the Titans following a robbery of a museum, Billy later appears as an alternate alongside See-More on the "H.I.V.E. Fivers" dodge-ball team. Billy would return with his fellow H.I.V.E. Five members in "Power Moves;" though he would try to outnumber the duo of Beast Boy and Cyborg, he and his duplicates would be defeated by their "Thunder Alley K-O" power move. In "No Power," he returns with the H.I.V.E. Five for yet another bank robbery; though she was barred from using her superpowers at the time due to a bet with Robin, Raven manages to defeat a duo of Billy clones using her walker as a weapon.

Billy Numerous would again accompany the H.I.V.E. Five in their latest crime spree upon their relocation to Gotham City during "Sidekick;" though seen enamored by the light show generated by the Ultimate Batarang, he and a series of his clones are defeated, seen mounted to walls by Batarangs after attempting to flee. Numerous also makes a non-physical cameo in "Caged Tiger," seen in one of the many images which line the interior of the Titans Tower elevator. Billy appears with the H.I.V.E. Five again in "Breakfast Cheese," and is ruthlessly pummeled for loitering near a "No Loitering" sign; he does the same to the Titans later in the episode, but is eventually won over by their kindness. In "Opposites," he aids in a H.I.V.E. Five bank robbery before becoming a crime-fighter in an attempt to accommodate Jinx's relationship with Cyborg. As the Teen Titans infiltrate and mitigate the destruction of the H.I.V.E. Headquarters during "In And Out," Billy and his clones end up moving into Titans Tower. Numerous would be swiftly defeated yet again by the Titans after a bank robbery in "Money Grandma."

See-More

 Voiced by: Kevin Michael Richardson (reprising)

Another member of the H.I.V.E. Five, See-More is a young African-American male wearing a helmet with multiple interchangeable super-powered eyeballs.

Slade

 Voiced by: Will Arnett

Slade is a masked supervillain and the archenemy of the Teen Titans, who is referenced and has brief cameos multiple times in the show before making his first speaking appearance as the main antagonist in Teen Titans Go! To the Movies.

Through the film, Slade poses as female director Jade Wilson (voiced by Kristen Bell) before revealing his true identity.

Trigon

 Voiced by: Kevin Michael Richardson (reprising)

Trigon is a malevolent intergalactic demon and the biological father of Raven. He is also the first major villain from Teen Titans to make an appearance in Teen Titans Go!.

Terra

 Voiced by: Ashley Johnson (reprising)

Terra is a young blonde blue-eyed teen girl with the elemental ability to control, manipulate and reshape earthen materials, particularly soil, dirt, stone, concrete, and rock.

Blackfire

 Voiced by: Hynden Walch (reprising)

Blackfire is the evil older sister of Starfire.

Brother Blood

 Voiced by: John DiMaggio (reprising)

Brother Blood, again portrayed as the Headmaster of the H.I.V.E. Academy, is a sinister cult leader with hypnotic powers. He first appears in Teen Titans Go! in a cameo during the episode "Legs," suffering the "Boot-A-Rang" attack from Raven, but is featured as the main villain of "Waffles."

Control Freak

 Voiced by: Alexander Polinsky (reprising)

Control Freak is an overweight geek who specializes in pop culture and various electronics.

Cinderblock

 Voiced by: None

Cinderblock is a large concrete monster, and was also the first villain character to appear in the original Teen Titans series. Ported from the DC Animated Universe into the main DC Universe in the time since, Cinderblock has made appearance in this series.

Dr. Light

 Voiced by: Scott Menville ("Colors Of Raven"), Rodger Bumpass ("Caged Tiger" onwards, reprising);

Dr. Light is an otherwise normal man who uses a suit powered by light energy to commit crimes, and often runs afoul of the Teen Titans. His most common attack is the firing of laser beams.

Killer Moth

 Voiced by: Scott Menville (replacing Thomas Haden Church and Marc Worden from the original series)

An evil scientist that experiments with moth larvae, Killer Moth first appears in "Missing,".

Plasmus

 Voiced by: None

Plasmus is a brown protoplasmic slime monster with multiple green eyes which seemingly acts without rational thought and seeks only to destroy.

Brain

 Voiced by: Scott Menville (replacing Glenn Shadix from the original series)

Debuting as the main villain of "Brian", The Brain, as his name suggests, is a human brain which is preserved in a mobile life-support unit framed with an evil skull design. The Brain is often partnered with his subordinate, Monsieur Mallah, and is also the leader of the Brotherhood of Evil.

Monsieur Mallah

 Voiced by: None

The partner-in-crime of The Brain, Monsieur Mallah is a large African gorilla sporting a Bandolier and armed with a laser rifle.

Ravager

 Voiced by: Pamela Adlon

Ravager is the daughter of Slade. She's been in multiple episodes as a friend and enemy, switching sides from episode to episode.

Mother Mae-Eye

 Voiced by: Billie Hayes (reprised in "Grandma Voice")

The first Teen Titans-exclusive villain to appear in Teen Titans Go!, Mother Mae-Eye is a sinister witch who is often camouflaged as a harmless and kindly old woman.

Mumbo

 Voiced by: Tom Kenny (reprising)

Mumbo, also known as The Amazing Mumbo and Mumbo Jumbo, is a turquoise-skinned stage magician who uses his tools of the trade for criminal purposes. He uses a magic wand as his main weapon.

Mad Mod

 Voiced by: None

Mad Mod is an elderly British man who has plans to gain power. He wields a special cane that enables him to drain the youth out of anyone.

Santa Claus
 Voiced by: Robert Morse, later Fred Tatasciore

Santa Claus is the mascot of Christmas and a reoccurring nemesis of the Teen Titans, usually attempting to take over the other holidays or going after the Teen Titans. Their view of Santa as a nemesis and his evil actions are comedically more serious than most of the other villains.

Little Buddies

Pain Bot
 Voiced by: Scott Menville (most appearances); Khary Payton ("Brian")

Pain Bot is a robotic torture device built by Brother Blood. Armed with multiple mechanical limbs with pain-inflicting implements, Pain Bot actually instills more terror into the Titans than Brother Blood does. It only makes one of two statements in any given episode: "PAIN," or "ALL I KNOW IS PAIN."

Beat Box
 Voiced by: None

Beat Box is one of the creations made by Cyborg and Robin in "Power Moves" after Robin becomes enamored with the concept in said episode. It is a living boombox with Robin's staff acting as its arms and legs. It can play music and dance.

Bird-A-Rang

 Voiced by: Scott Menville

One of Robin's trademark projectile weapons, Bird-A-Rang is a Birdarang which is capable of free thought and human speech. Though first seen pulled from Silkie's mouth during the events of "Books," it is first seen in a true character's capacity in the later episode "Power Moves."

Super Robin

 Voiced by: None

In an effort to gain superpowers, Robin attempts to instigate a freak laboratory accident between himself and a bird of his namesake in a teleportation chamber which fuses them together. While Robin unintentionally ends up mutating himself into a humanoid bird creature as a result, the bird ends up inheriting Robin's acrobatic agility, a black mask, and miniature versions of Robin's arsenal.

Silkie

 Voiced by: Uncredited; Tara Strong ("Missing", replacing Dee Bradley Baker from the original series)

Silkie was once a mutated moth larva created by Killer Moth for villainous purposes, but would then be adopted by the Titans as their official pet. First raised by Beast Boy, Silkie would later bond with Starfire. Silkie is the main "Little Buddy" of the series and considered the "Team Pet" for the Titans. He appeared in the majority of the episodes in Season 1 and 2, before his appearances were cut back afterwards.

Demon 
 Voiced by: None
Demon is an underworld creature first seen in "Driver's Ed", where Raven attempted to banish it back into its realm. Before she could, Robin grabbed her to carry out a favor, allowing the Demon to roam free over Jump City, pursuing any unfortunate victim it could such as the Seagull or Robin's phony Driver's Ed instructor.

Following these events, Raven and the Demon managed to become on friendly terms, the Demon being considered her "Little Buddy".

Dave 

 Voiced by: None

Dave is a feral wolf who Beast Boy somehow took up as a "Little Buddie". Despite being a wild animal, he is shown to be welcome among the Teen Titans, except for Robin who is often mauled by the wolf.

Guest appearances
Aquaman

 Voiced by: Eric Bauza (in Teen Titans Go! To the Movies), Patrick Warburton (in "Finding Aquaman" and "Pool Season")

He is referenced in several episodes.

Batgirl

 Voiced by: Tara Strong

Batgirl is first seen dancing at the first annual Titans East Dance Party in "Starliar". A future version of her later appears as the wife of Nightwing and a mother of three in "Staring At The Future". She also briefly appears in "Black Friday" at the mall with various other DC characters, and is referenced in "Sidekick" as Starfire wears her uniform throughout much of the episode.

Batman

 Voiced by: Khary Payton (most episodes), Kevin Conroy (in "Real Orangins"), Jimmy Kimmel (in Teen Titans Go! To the Movies)

He is either seen or is otherwise referenced at least once per episode.

Black Manta

Voiced by: JB Smoove (in "Finding Aquaman" and "Pool Season")

Aquaman's archenemy, who shrinks him and the Titans and traps them in a fish tank.

Commissioner Gordon

Voiced by: Eric Bauza

The police commissioner of Gotham, and one of Batman's closest allies. In the series, he is usually seen alongside Batman, and usually does not speak.

Freakazoid

Voiced by: Paul Rugg (reprising)

He appears in the episode "Huggbees". The Teen Titans summon him to help fight Brain after he teams up with the Lobe. When Freakazoid mentions that he can't do a crossover unless Steven Spielberg approves, Robin sends Spielberg a text about it and gets his approval to do so.

Lobe

Voiced by: David Warner (reprising)

A brain-headed villain who is the archenemy of Freakazoid. He appears in the episode "Huggbees" where Brain allies with him, causing the Teen Titans to enlist Freakazoid.

Sgt. Mike Cosgove

Voiced by: Ed Asner (reprising)

A police sergeant who is Freakazoid's police contact and friend.

Joe Leahy

Voiced by: Himself (reprising)

The narrator of Freakazoid!.

The Powerpuff Girls

Voiced by: Amanda Leighton (Blossom), Kristen Li (Bubbles), Natalie Palamides (Buttercup)

The Powerpuff Girls appears in "TTG vs. PPG" where they pursue Mojo Jojo to Jump City.

Mojo Jojo

Voiced by: Roger L. Jackson

An evil chimpanzee with an abnormally large brain who is the Powerpuff Girls' archenemy. He traveled to Jump City to take advantage of the Teen Titans as he deemed them incompetent.

Superman

Voiced by: Nicolas Cage (in Teen Titans Go! To the Movies)

A member of the Justice League. He has made various appearances throughout the series, most prominently in "TV Knight 3" at Batman's birthday party and as a judge in the "Justice League's Next Top Talent Idol Star" series of episodes.

Teenage Mutant Ninja Turtles

Voiced by: Greg Cipes (Michelangelo), Scott Menville (Donatello)

They appear in "Truth, Justice, and What?".

ThunderCats

Voiced by: Larry Kenney (80's Lion-O), Max Mittelman (2020 Lion-O), Michael Jelenic (80's Snarf)

The Teen Titans interacted with the version of the ThunderCats from ThunderCats Roar. The 80s Lion-O appeared from cartoon heaven, saying that ThunderCats Roar is a good successor to the original cartoon. The 80's Snarf was seen in a cave with 2011 Lion-O.

Wonder Woman

Voiced by: Halsey (in Teen Titans Go! To the Movies)

A member of the Justice League. She has made various appearances throughout the series, most prominently in "TV Knight 3" at Batman's birthday party and as a judge in the "Justice League's Next Top Talent Idol Star" series of episodes.

References

External links
 Teen Titans Go! on Cartoon Network
 Teen Titans Go! on IMDb
 Comic Book Resources: Teen Titans Go! Cast & Crew on Titans' Animated Evolution
 Behind the Voice Actors: Teen Titans Go!
 IGN: Teen Titans Go! Producers and Cast Talk About Their Comedic Approach

Lists of characters in American television animation
DC Comics child superheroes
Superhero teams
Animated human characters
Child characters in television
Television characters introduced in 2013
Lists of DC Comics animated television characters
Lists of DC Nation television characters
Lists of minor fictional characters